Henry Nicholson Morse (1835-1912), "bloodhound of the far west," was an Old West lawman. Elected September 2, 1863 served from 1864 to 1878, as the sheriff of the Alameda County Sheriff's Office of Alameda County, California. He was a Republican. He later founded the Harry N. Morse Detective Agency in California. One of his accomplishments was to help (along with his associate James Hume) identify Charles E. Boles as the perpetrator of the Black Bart stagecoach robberies. Other notable early California outlaws he helped bring to justice include Bartolo Sepulveda, Narrato Ponce, "Red-Handed Procopio, and Juan Soto.

Morse made his reputation by breaking up the gangs of Hispanic bandidos that infested central and southern California in the 1860s and 1870s. He shot and killed the notorious outlaw Narato Ponce after fighting two desperate gun duels with him, wounding Ponce in the first fight, then tracking him down and killing him in a second shootout months later. He captured Procopio Bustamante, nephew of the legendary Joaquin Murrieta, in a San Francisco brothel in 1872.  He tracked the Tiburcio Vasquez gang for two months and 2700 miles, finally locating him in an adobe house in what is now West Hollywood.  Morse provided the tip to Los Angeles County Sheriff Billy Rowland, whose posse captured Vasquez in 1874.  After leaving the post of Alameda County sheriff in 1878, he formed his own private detective agency.  In 1883 he captured Charles E. Boles, better known as Black Bart, the Poet Highwayman, in San Francisco.  He broke up the Harkins Opium Smuggling Ring which resulted in the prosecution of a corrupt federal magistrate in San Francisco.  He investigated San Francisco's Dupont Street Frauds case of the 1880s, exposing the corruption of the city's mayor, Andrew J. Bryant.  He worked on the defense of Theodore Durrant, the "Beast in the Belfry" who committed several sex murders in San Francisco.  Durrant was convicted and executed on the gallows in San Quentin.  His last big case was the poisoning death of Jane Stanford, founder of Stanford University, in 1905.

References

Sources
Boessenecker, John. Lawman: the Life and times of Harry Morse, 1835-1912. Norman: University of Oklahoma, 1998
 Bill O'Neal, Encyclopedia of Western Gunfighters. Norman: University of Oklahoma, 1979, pp. 328–239
 Mitchel P. Roth, James Stuart Olson, Historical Dictionary of Law Enforcement. Westport, Greenwood Press, 2001, p. 82

External links 
 Lawman: the life and times of Harry Morse, 1835-1912 Google Books Result
A Guide to the 	Henry N. Morse records, 90-84. Special Collections, University Libraries, University of Nevada, Reno

Lawmen of the American Old West
Private detectives and investigators
1835 births
1912 deaths
Alameda County sheriffs
California Republicans